The Torneo Argentino C (officially Torneo del Interior) was one of the two leagues that form the regionalised fifth level of the Argentine football league system. The competition was organized by the Federal Council (Consejo Federal), an internal organ of the Argentine Football Association (AFA), and was contested by clubs indirectly affiliated to the Association. In other words, the clubs that played in the tournament are affiliated to their local leagues, that in turn are affiliated to AFA.

The tournament was disputed by teams from all around the country, except from Buenos Aires, Greater Buenos Aires, Rosario and Santa Fe, whose teams are directly affiliated. Teams directly affiliated play in the other regionalised fifth tier, the Primera D Metropolitana.

Teams in the Argentino C played for promotion to the Torneo Argentino B. On the other hand, there is no unique league below this level. Teams were relegated to their original regional leagues.

List of champions
European-styled seasons

See also
Argentine football league system
List of football clubs in Argentina

References

External links
Official site 
All-time table of the Torneo del Interior 

 
Defunct football leagues in Argentina
Sports leagues established in 2005
2005 establishments in Argentina
Sports leagues disestablished in 2014
2014 disestablishments in Argentina